Georgie Poynton  is an Irish professional footballer who last played for League of Ireland Premier Division club Drogheda United. He has previously played for Shelbourne for 2 years,  Waterford for a season, St Patrick's Athletic for 2 months as well as his first senior club Dundalk for 5 years including a season on loan at Bohemians.

Club career

Youth career
Poynton started off playing with East Meath United, before moving to Dundalk aged 15 in August 2013. He was fast tracked to the club's under 19's team and continued to impress at that level despite playing 3 years above his age group. He became the youngest ever player to sign a professional contract with Dundalk aged just 16 years 5 months old, on 14 February 2014, despite interest from Middlesbrough and Hibernians.

Dundalk

2014 season
Poynton made his first team debut for Dundalk on 5 May 2014 in a 3–0 League of Ireland Cup win over Bray Wanderers at the Carlisle Grounds. He went on to make 2 more appearances in the competition that season as Dundalk won the 2014 League of Ireland Cup as well as the league title.

2015 season
On 22 May 2015, Poynton made his League of Ireland debut, coming on as a substitute for Ronan Finn in a 2–0 win away to St Patrick's Athletic. He made a total of 8 appearances in all competitions, including 3 in the Leinster Senior Cup, one of which being in the final as his side won the competition by beating Shamrock Rovers 3–1 at Oriel Park. Poynton also picked up a league winners medal as Dundalk retained their League of Ireland Premier Division title as well as winning the 2015 FAI Cup. He signed a new 2-year contract on 5 November 2015.

2016 season
Poynton made 9 appearances in all competitions, 4 in the league, 3 in the FAI Cup and 2 in the Leinster Senior Cup, picking up another league winner's medal. Poynton also appeared on the bench as an unused substitute in Dundalk's UEFA Champions League games at home and away against BATE Borisov, as well as a 1–1 draw away to Legia Warsaw in the Champions League play-off Round Second Leg.

2017 – Bohemians Loan
2017 was the first season Poynton was finished up playing Under 19's football with Dundalk alongside senior football and with Dundalk chasing their fourth league title in a row, they opted to send Poynton out on loan in order to get game time at first team level. He was loaned out to Bohemians until the summer ahead of the season. Poynton's impressive form saw Bohs extend the loan deal until the end of the season. He made 27 appearances for Bohs, scoring 5 goals in his first full season as a senior player.

2018 season
Poynton returned to Dundalk for the 2018 season, signing a new contract with the club on 8 January 2018. 2018 proved to be a difficult one for Poynton as he struggled to break into the starting eleven ahead of Robbie Benson, Stephen O'Donnell and Chris Shields. He made 11 appearances in all competitions as Dundalk smashed many records to retain their league title and also completing the double by beating Cork City to win the FAI Cup at the Aviva Stadium.

St Patrick's Athletic
On 29 November 2018, it was announced that Poynton had signed for Dublin club St Patrick's Athletic, becoming new manager Harry Kenny's fifth new signing. Poynton made his debut on 18 February in a 3–0 Leinster Senior Cup win over Wexford at Richmond Park. It was announced on 23 February 2019 that Poynton had left the club by mutual consent, having not made the bench in the Saints first two league games of the season, with Poynton facing an uphill battle for first team action as the club had signed Chris Forrester and Rhys McCabe in his position after he had signed.

Waterford
Waterford announced the signing of Poynton the same day it was announced he had left St Patrick's Athletic, with Poynton seeking more first team action. Poynton was a mainstay in the Waterford team that season, playing 32 of their 36 league matches as they finished 6th. His first and only goal for the club came on the final day of the season when he converted a penalty in a 4-2 home win against UCD.

Shelbourne

2020 season 
Shelbourne announced the signing of Poynton ahead of their return to the Premier Division for the 2020 season. He made his debut in a 2-1 loss at home to his former club Dundalk. His first goal for the club was a penalty at Oriel Park against the same opposition on 11 September. Poynton also picked up an assist in this match. He scored a header in a 3-1 Dublin Derby loss to Bohemians on 3 October. Shelbourne were relegated back to the First Division after a play off loss to Longford Town, but Georgie renewed his contract with the club for another season, after ending the campaign with 2 goals and 2 assists in 15 appearances

2021 season 

Poynton started the 2021 season very well, and scored a brace to save a 3-3 draw with Bray Wanderers on matchday 2. He got the winning goal when Shelbourne travelled to Wexford on 18 June, and assisted the following week when they recorded a big win over Cork City. He was on the scoresheet again against Cabinteely, and his penalty against Treaty United on 1 October gave Shelbourne a win that officially confirmed them as First Division champions. Poynton left Shelbourne in December 2021 upon expiry of his contract. In total he made 40 appearances for the club, scoring 7 goals and 6 assists

Drogheda United 
After leaving Shelbourne, Poynton signed for his hometown club Drogheda United. He made his debut against his former club Shelbourne on the opening day of the season. He scored his first and only goal for the Drogs away to Sligo Rovers on 23 April. Poynton made 29 appearances as a right back in all competitions as Drogheda avoided relegation by finishing 8th place.

International career
Poynton has played at underage level for Ireland right up from under 16 to under 19 levels as well as competing at Universities International level, captaining his team at all levels. On 19 March 2017, Poynton was named Republic of Ireland U19 Player of the Year for 2016 after his excellent performances.

Career statistics
Professional appearances – correct as of 9 September 2022.

Honours

Club
Dundalk
League of Ireland Premier Division (4): 2014, 2015, 2016, 2018
FAI Cup (2): 2015, 2018
League of Ireland Cup (1): 2014
President's Cup (1): 2015
Leinster Senior Cup (1): 2015

Shelbourne
League of Ireland First Division (1): 2021

Individual
Republic of Ireland U19 Player of the Year: 2016

References

External links
 
 
 
 
 

1997 births
Living people
People from County Meath
Association footballers from County Meath
Dundalk F.C. players
Bohemian F.C. players
St Patrick's Athletic F.C. players
Waterford F.C. players
Shelbourne F.C. players
Drogheda United F.C. players
League of Ireland players
Association football midfielders
Republic of Ireland association footballers